Peraxilla tetrapetala, or red mistletoe, is a parasitic plant in the family Loranthaceae, endemic to New Zealand and found on both the North and South Islands. The Māori names for the plant are pikirangi, pirirangi and roeroe.

It is a shrub up to one metre tall with glabrous leaves. The flowers are 4–5 mm long, bright red to orange in colour which split open to the base. Red mistletoe mainly parasitises  Quintinia and Nothofagus species. Its principle host is the black/mountain beech (Nothofagus solandri complex). However, north of latitude 38°S this species utilises tawheowheo (Quintinia serrata), and in the far north has been found on pohutukawa
(Metrosideros excelsa), puriri (Vitex lucens) and towai (Weinmannia sylvicola), and hence, is the most widely distributed beech mistletoe.

P. tetrapetala is hermaphroditic, self-compatible, and is both bird-pollinated and bird-dispersed, yet has an explosive bud-opening mechanism. It is thought that birds are more important for seed dispersal than for pollination.

The caterpillar of the endemic moth Zelleria maculata feeds on the inside flower buds of P. tetrapetala.

Conservation
The plant is highly palatable to the introduced common brushtail possum resulting in a threat to the plant population.
The possum browsing effect appears more important in the North Island than in the South Island, where the major cause of foliage browse has been attributed to insect attack.  A continued major threat is habitat loss.

Red mistletoe is listed as in "Gradual Decline" in the New Zealand Threat Classification System and relies on conservation measures to halt the decline.

References

External links

Department of Conservation - mistletoe page
University of Canterbury  - mistletoe photographs
Citizen science observations of Peraxilla tetrapetala.

Loranthaceae
Flora of New Zealand
Endemic flora of New Zealand